Hypochthonius rufulus is a species of mite in the family Hypochthoniidae. It is found in Europe.

Subspecies
These four subspecies belong to the species Hypochthonius rufulus:
 Hypochthonius rufulus carolinicus Jacot, 1936
 Hypochthonius rufulus europaeus Krivolutsky, 1965
 Hypochthonius rufulus paucipectinatus Jacot, 1934
 Hypochthonius rufulus rufulus Koch, 1835

References

Acariformes
Articles created by Qbugbot
Animals described in 1835